"Pilots" is an electronic song written by British group Goldfrapp for their debut studio album Felt Mountain (2000). The song was produced by Goldfrapp and received a positive reception from music critics. It was released as a double A-side single with "Lovely Head" in the fourth quarter of 2001, and became the band's second single to chart within the top seventy-five in the United Kingdom.

Formats and track listings
These are the formats and track listings of major single releases of "Pilots".

 CD single #1 (UK)
 "Pilots (On a Star)" – 3:55
 "Lovely Head" – 3:46
 "Horse Tears" (Live)* – 5:37

 CD single #2 (UK)
 "Pilots (On a Star)" – 3:57
 "Lovely Head" (Staré Město) – 3:52
 "Utopia" (Tom Middleton Cosmos Acid Dub) – 7:21
 "Pilots (On a Star)" (Video) – 3:57

 *Recorded at Ancienne Belgique, Brussels, 2 April 2001.

References

External links
Goldfrapp.com — official website.
Mute.com — official website for Mute Records.

2001 singles
2002 singles
Goldfrapp songs
Songs written by Alison Goldfrapp
Songs written by Will Gregory
Mute Records singles
2001 songs
Songs about aviators